Schrankia bruntoni is a species of moth of the family Erebidae first described by Jeremy Daniel Holloway in 2008. It is found in Brunei on Borneo.

References

Moths described in 2008
Hypenodinae